The 1931 Arizona Wildcats football team represented the University of Arizona in the Border Conference during the 1931 college football season. In their first and only season under head coach Fred Enke, the Wildcats compiled a 3–5–1 record (1–1–1 against Border opponents), finished third in the conference, and were outscored by their opponents, 149 to 72. The team captain was Horace Collier.  The team played its home games at Arizona Stadium in Tucson, Arizona.

Schedule

References

Arizona
Arizona Wildcats football seasons
Arizona Wildcats football